Neofaculta confidella is a moth in the family Gelechiidae. It was described by Rebel in 1936. It is found in south-eastern Turkey, Iraq and northern Syria.

The wingspan is about 18 mm (0.71 inches). The forewings are reddish-grey.

References

Chelariini
Moths described in 1936